Galichsky Uyezd (Галичский уезд) was one of the subdivisions of the Kostroma Governorate of the Russian Empire. It was situated in the western part of the governorate. Its administrative centre was Galich.

Demographics
At the time of the Russian Empire Census of 1897, Galichsky Uyezd had a population of 107,609. Of these, 99.7% spoke Russian, 0.2% Latvian and 0.1% Yiddish as their native language.

References

 
Uezds of Kostroma Governorate
Kostroma Governorate